Henry Joliffe B.D. was Dean of Bristol from 1554 to 1559.

Joliffe educated at Clare College, Cambridge. He held livings at Hampton Bishop and Houghton, Huntingtonshire.

He died at Louvain on 28 January 1574.

References

16th-century English Anglican priests
Alumni of Clare College, Cambridge
Deans of Bristol